Mudashiru Ajayi Obasa (born 11 November 1972) is a Nigerian lawyer and politician who has served as speaker of the Lagos State House of Assembly since 2015.

He is a member of the ruling All Progressives Congress.

Early life
Mudashiru Ajayi Obasa was born in Agege, a town in Lagos State southwestern Nigeria on 11 November 1972. He had his primary education at St Thomas Acquinas Pry School, Surulere, Lagos before he proceeded to Archbishop Aggey Memorial Secondary school, Mushin, Ilasamaja, Lagos where he obtained the West Africa School Certificate.
He received a bachelor's degree in Law from Lagos State University, Lagos in the year 2006.

Political career
In 1999, he contested the seat of councilor at Agege local government under the Alliance for Democracy party and won. He served between 1999 and 2002.

He was elected to the Lagos State House of Assembly representing Agege Constituency I in 2007. He was reelected in 2011, 2015 and in 2019.

Amidst the #EndSARS saga in his home state, he was recorded on live TV saying "the LSHA will not acknowledge the death of miscreants at the hands of the Police Force" when calling for the one-minute silence for the victims of the #LekkiMassacre and others across Nigeria.

Corruption Scandal 
In 2020, The Sahara Reporters reportedly released allegation reports on misappropriation of public funds against him. He however denied all the allegations.

Sahara Reporters later reported that Obasa was taken in for questioning by the Economic and Financial Crimes Commission on 8 and 9 October.2020.  According to an inside source confirmed to SaharaReporters that Obasa feigned sickness during the interrogation at the EFCC’s office, which caused interrogation to be stopped. Obasa had to be taken to the EFCC office's sick bay before being released on bail. Obasa then supposedly requested the return of his passport, ostensibly to seek medical treatment abroad before going on Umrah to meet with Bola Tinubu in Saudi Arabia. Obasa remains under investigation by the EFCC for allegations of misappropriation and fraud.

See also
List of Yoruba people

References

1972 births
Living people
Nigerian Muslims
Lagos State University alumni
People from Lagos State
Speakers of the Lagos State House of Assembly
20th-century Nigerian lawyers
All Progressives Congress politicians